Albert Parker may refer to:

 Albert Parker (businessman) (1916–1995), American owner of the Claxton Bakery
 Albert Parker (director) (1885–1974), American film director, producer, screenwriter and actor
 Albert Parker, 3rd Earl of Morley (1843–1905), British peer and politician
 Albert Parker (footballer) (1927–2005), English footballer

See also
Bert Parker (disambiguation)
Al Parker (disambiguation)